Rio is a comune (municipality) in the province of Livorno, Tuscany, Italy, located on the island of Elba.

The municipality is formed by the towns of Rio Marina, Rio nell'Elba, Cavo and Bagnaia, and the villages of Capo d'Arco, Nisportino, Nisporto and Ortano. Rio also includes the small islands of Cerboli and Palmaiola.

It was established in January 2018.

References